Abū Bakr ibn al-Ḥasan ibn ʿAlī was the son of Hasan ibn Ali. He went to Karbala with his uncle Husayn ibn Ali, and was killed in the Battle of Karbala on the day of Ashura.

Lineage 

Abu Bakr was a son of Hasan ibn Ali and his mother, possibly a woman named Ramla, was a bonded servant. Some believe that he and his brother Qasim were both sons of Ramla.

On the day of Ashura 
Abu al-Faraj considers Abu Bakr's martyrdom to have occurred before that of Qasim. Abu al-Faraj quotes from Al-Mada'ini, who through his chain of transmitters quotes from Abu Mikhnaf, and from Sulayman bin Rashid that Abu Bakr was martyred by an arrow shot fired by Abd Allah ibn Uqba al-Ghanawi. But Al-Tabari, Ibn Athir, Shaykh Mufid and others relate his martyrdom as occurring after that of Qasim. 

Abu Bakr's name is mentioned in Ziyarat al-Nahiya al-Muqaddasa and Ziyarat Rajabiyya and his murderer has been cursed.

References 

Husayn ibn Ali
Hussainiya
680 deaths
Year of birth unknown
People killed at the Battle of Karbala

Family of Muhammad